Henry Young Shepherd MBE (1857–1947)  was the Dean of Antigua from 1906  until 1930. 
 
Shepherd was educated at Codrington College and  ordained in 1882. His first post was a curacy at  St George, Antigua after which he served his whole career at the Cathedral: first as Rector; then Vicar general and finally Dean.

He died on 30 January 1952.

References

1857 births
1947 deaths
Alumni of Codrington College
Deans of Antigua
Members of the Order of the British Empire